The paranoiac-critical method is a surrealist technique developed by Salvador Dalí in the early 1930s. He employed it in the production of paintings and other artworks, especially those that involved optical illusions and other multiple images. The technique consists of the artist invoking a paranoid state (fear that the self is being manipulated, targeted or controlled by others). The result is a deconstruction of the psychological concept of identity, such that subjectivity becomes the primary aspect of the artwork.

Origins 

The surrealists related theories of psychology to the idea of creativity and the production of art. In the mid-1930s André Breton wrote about a "fundamental crisis of the object".  The object began being thought of not as a fixed external object but also as an extension of our subjective self. One of the types of objects theorized in surrealism was the phantom object.

According to Dalí, these objects have a minimum of mechanical meaning, but, when viewed, the mind evokes phantom images which are the result of unconscious acts.

The paranoiac-critical arose from similar surrealistic experiments with psychology and the creation of images such as Max Ernst's frottage or Óscar Domínguez's decalcomania, two surrealist techniques, which involved rubbing pencil or chalk on paper over a textured surface and interpreting the phantom images visible in the texture on the paper.

Description 

The aspect of paranoia that Dalí was interested in and which helped inspire the method was the ability of the brain to perceive links between things which rationally are not linked. Dalí described the paranoiac-critical method as a "spontaneous method of irrational knowledge based on the critical and systematic objectivity of the associations and interpretations of delirious phenomena".

Employing the method when creating a work of art uses an active process of the mind to visualize images in the work and incorporate these into the final product. An example of the resulting work is a double image or multiple image in which an ambiguous image can be interpreted in different ways.

André Breton (by way of Guy Mangeot) hailed the method, saying that Dalí's paranoiac-critical method was an "instrument of primary importance" and that it "has immediately shown itself capable of being applied equally to painting, poetry, the cinema, the construction of typical Surrealist objects, fashion, sculpture, the history of art, and even, if necessary, all manner of exegesis".

In his introduction to the 1994 edition of Jacques Lacan's The Four Fundamental Concepts of Psychoanalysis, David Macey stated that "Salvador Dalí's theory of 'paranoic knowledge' is certainly of great relevance to the young Lacan."

See also 

 Delirious New York, a book that discusses Dalí and the paranoiac-critical method.

References

Further reading 

 Une lecture paranoïaque-critique de La Maison Tellier (Guy de Maupassant), Jean-Claude Lutanie, Le Veilleur Éditeur, 1993

Surrealist techniques
Salvador Dalí